Winston Murray Hunt Hibler (October 8, 1910 – August 8, 1976) was an American screenwriter, film producer, director and narrator associated with Walt Disney Studios.

Biography and career

Hibler was born in Harrisburg, Pennsylvania on October 10, 1910. He was the youngest child of Christopher Hibler and Louise Eisenbeis.

He wanted to be an actor in New York at the age of 12. In 1930, he graduated from the American Academy of Dramatic Arts and performed on Broadway, In the Best of Families. Later in the same year, he married Dottie Johnson, with whom he had three children.

A year later, he moved to Hollywood to pursue his career on Broadway, he appeared in a small role in The Last Days of Pompeii. Later, he took up freelance writing for magazines and radio to help supplement his income.

In 1942, Hibler joined Walt Disney Productions as a camera operator. Then later on, he worked as a technical director for the U.S. Army training films. As a songwriter, Hibler contributed lyrics with Ted Sears, who wrote songs for some musical films, like Following the Leader from Peter Pan, and I Wonder from Sleeping Beauty. Hibler also voice-over roles in documentary films, and some series in True-Life Adventures and People and Places.

In 1961, Hibler produced his feature film, Nikki, Wild Dog of the North. Later in 1963, Hibler and his wife moved to Glendale, California.

He died on August 8, 1976, in Burbank, just three years before his last release, The Black Hole.

He posthumously awarded as Disney Legend in 1992.

Select filmography

Narrator
 Seal Island (1948)
 In Beaver Valley (1950)
 Nature's Half Acre (1951)
 Water Birds (1952)
 The Living Desert (1953) 
 Bear Country (1953)
 Prowlers of the Everglades (1953) 
 The Vanishing Prairie (1954)
 The African Lion (1955) 
 Secrets of Life (1956) 
 Perri (1957)
 White Wilderness (1958) 
 Jungle Cat (1960) 
 King of the Grizzlies (1970)
 The Best of Walt Disney's True-Life Adventures (1975)

Screenwriter
 Melody Time (1948) (Johnny Appleseed segment)
 The Adventures of Ichabod and Mr. Toad (1949) (both The Wind in the Willows and The Legend of Sleepy Hollow segments)
 Cinderella (1950)
 Alice in Wonderland (1951)
 Peter Pan (1953)
 The Living Desert (1953)
 The Vanishing Prairie (1954)
 Perri (1957)
 Sleeping Beauty (1959)
 Nikki, Wild Dog of the North (1961)
 Winnie the Pooh and the Blustery Day (1968) (Story supervisor)
 The Best of Walt Disney's True-Life Adventures (1975)

Director
 Men Against the Arctic (1955)

Producer
 Nikki, Wild Dog of the North (1961)
 Follow Me, Boys! (1966)
 The Aristocats (1970)
 The Castaway Cowboy (1974)
 The Bears and I (1974)
 The Island at the Top of the World (1974)

Recognition

Awards and nominations
 1951, Hugo Award co-nomination for 'Best Dramatic Presentation' for Cinderella (1950) 
 1956, won Berlin International Film Festival 'Golden Plaque' for Men Against the Arctic (1955)
 1959, Grammy Award co-nomination for 'Best Soundtrack Album, Original Cast – Motion Picture or Television' for Sleeping Beauty (1959)

References

External links
 
 
 Winston Hibler at Disney Legends

1910 births
1976 deaths
American male screenwriters
American film producers
American animated film producers
Animation screenwriters
Walt Disney Animation Studios people
Writers from Harrisburg, Pennsylvania
Burials at Forest Lawn Memorial Park (Glendale)
Film directors from Pennsylvania
20th-century American male writers
20th-century American screenwriters